Tuti may refer to:

Places
 Tuti, Estonia, a village
 Tuti, Sistan and Baluchestan, Iran
 Tuti, South Khorasan, Iran, a village
 Tuti District, Peru
 Tuti Island, Sudan

People
 Tuti Indra Malaon (1939-1989), Indonesian actress, dancer and lecturer born Pudjiastuti Suratno
 Tuti Yusupova (1880?-2015), Uzbekistani claimed to be the longest-lived person ever
 Yuichi Tsuchiya (born 1979), Japanese actor nicknamed "Tuti"